Pyrrhopappus is a genus of North American plants in the tribe Cichorieae within the family Asteraceae. Desert-chicory is a common name.

 Species
 Pyrrhopappus carolinianus (Walter) DC. - southeastern + south-central United States
 Pyrrhopappus grandiflorus (Nutt.) Nutt. - Great Plains from Nebraska to Texas
 Pyrrhopappus pauciflorus (D.Don) DC. - southern United States from Arizona to Florida; Mexico (Coahuila, Nuevo León, Durango, Tamaulipas)
 Pyrrhopappus rothrockii A.Gray - Chihuahua, Coahuila, New Mexico, Durango, Nuevo León, Arizona, San Luis Potosí, Texas, Puebla
 Pyrrhopappus taraxacoides DC.

 formerly included
see Lactuca 
 Pyrrhopappus hochstetteri A.Rich. - Lactuca inermis Forssk.
 Pyrrhopappus humilis A.Rich. - Lactuca inermis Forssk.

References

Flora of North America
Asteraceae genera
Cichorieae